The 2017 Asian Judo Championships were the 23rd edition of the Asian Judo Championships, and were held in Hong Kong from May 26 to May 28, 2017.

Medal summary

Men

Women

Medal table

References
 Results

External links
 

Asian Championships
Asian Judo Championships
Asian Judo Championships
Judo Asian